Thornton State Beach is a protected beach in the state park system of California, United States.  It is located on the Pacific coast of Daly City in the San Francisco Bay Area.   The  park was established in 1955.

The Mediterranean climate tends toward cold and wind, with fog common in summer.

The beach was named for the first white settler of the area, one Robert S. Thornton of Rhode Island, a blacksmith who had arrived in the San Francisco area in 1851.

The park was closed in 2009 due to damage and continued danger from landslides, but as of late 2021 is fully open.

See also
List of California state parks

References

External links
Thornton State Beach

California State Beaches
Parks in San Mateo County, California
Protected areas established in 1955
San Francisco Bay Area beaches
Beaches of San Mateo County, California
Beaches of Northern California
1955 establishments in California